South Beaver Dam is an unincorporated community in Dodge County, Wisconsin, United States, in the town of Calamus. The community is located just south of the city of Beaver Dam. The ZIP code is 53916. It is part of the Beaver Dam Micropolitan Statistical Area. The community lies on the southern shore of Beaver Dam Lake.

Education
The South Beaver Dam Elementary School, which is part of the Beaver Dam Unified School District, is located in South Beaver Dam.

References

Unincorporated communities in Dodge County, Wisconsin
Unincorporated communities in Wisconsin